Jambonet is a Kenyan internet service provider.  Until June 30, 2004, it operated as the sole carrier of international internet traffic to and from Kenya.  Its monopoly partially ended on that date under terms of which the government of Kenya began licensing other companies to compete in the field of internet telephony. Jambonet currently uses four VSAT satellites to carry the country's internet traffic.

Jambonet is a subsidiary of Telkom Kenya.

In 1999, Telkom Kenya was founded as a telecommunications provider.

See also
Kenya Internet Exchange

References

External links
Jambonet page at Telkom Kenya
 Kenya ISP complaining about Jumbonet monopoly
 A paper that extensively discusses problems facing Jumbonet
The Jambonet entry at the KIXP

Telecommunications companies of Kenya